Burelle is a French holding company headquartered in Paris. Its most important subsidiary is Plastic Omnium.

History
Burelle was founded in 1957 by Pierre Burelle and his family as a legal entity for its growing businesses. In 1987, Burelle went public and was listed on the Bourse de Lyon.

Subsidiaries

Plastic Omnium

Burelle  controls a 55.1 percent stake in Plastic Omnium, making it the largest shareholder. Plastic Omnium is a plastic processing company engaged in the manufacture of vehicle components and elements for waste management.

Sofiparc
Sofiparc is a French company that provides asset management services and owns property for rental and construction. As of 2010, the company had  in offices and 270 parking lots. It was founded in 1989 and is headquartered in Lyon.

Burelle Participations
Burelle Participations is a French private equity company. It focuses on giving money to help launch new businesses and in leveraged buyout. The company centers its investments in medium-sized French companies. It considers investments in all sectors except the automotive. It invests between 1 and 5 million euros per transaction in the majority of financing rounds in companies with revenues between 10 and 200 million euros. Burelle Participations was founded in 2001 and is headquartered in Paris.

Ownership structure
At the end of 2011, the Burelle family held a 77.85 percent stake in Burelle. This control was exercised directly and also indirectly, through the shareholders Sogec 2 and Compagnie Financière de la Cascade, with a 35.37 and 21.49 percent stake respectively. The Burelles controlled 90.25 percent of voting rights. 16.62 percent of the shares were public.

References

Holding companies established in 1957
Companies based in Paris
French companies established in 1957
Holding companies of France